This is a list of current and former Roman Catholic churches in the Roman Catholic Diocese of Marquette. The diocese covers 16,377 square miles comprising the Upper Peninsula of Michigan and is divided into seven administrative vicariates as follows:
 St. Peter Cathedral Vicariate: Marquette County (named for St. Peter Cathedral, the diocesan cathedral church in Marquette);
 Holy Name of Mary Vicariate: Chippewa, Luce, and Mackinac Counties (named for the Holy Name of Mary Pro-Cathedral in Sault Ste. Marie);
 Most Holy Name of Jesus Vicariate: Baraga and Houghton Counties (including the cities of Hancock and Houghton);
 St. John Newman Vicariate: Menominee County (including the city of Menominee);
 St. Joseph and St. Patrick Vicariate: Delta and Schoolcraft Counties (named for the St. Joseph & St. Patrick church in Escanaba);
 St. Mary Norway Vicariate: Dickinson and Iron Counties (including the city of Ironwood); and
 St. Mary Rockland Vicariate: Gogebic and Ontonagon Counties at the western tip of the diocese.

St. Peter Cathedral Vicariate
The St. Peter Cathedral Vicariate consists of Marquette County, Michigan, and includes the St. Peter Cathedral in Marquette and St. John the Evangelist Church in Ishpeming.

Holy Name of Mary Vicariate
The Holy Name of Mary Vicariate consists of the three eastern counties of the Upper Peninsula: Chippewa, Luce, and Mackinac. It includes Sainte Anne on Mackinac Island and the Holy Name of Mary Pro-Cathedral in Sault Ste. Marie.

Most Holy Name of Jesus Vicariate
The Most Holy Name of Jesus Vicariate consists of the Upper Peninsula counties of Baraga and Houghton.

St. John Newman Vicariate
The St. John Newman Vicariate consists of the Upper Peninsula county of Menominee.

St. Joseph and St. Patrick Vicariate
The St. Joseph and St. Patrick Vicariate consists of the Upper Peninsula counties of Delta and Schoolcraft.

St. Mary Norway Vicariate
The St. Mary Norway Vicariate consists of the Upper Peninsula counties of Dickinson and Iron.

St. Mary Rockland Vicariate
The St. Mary Rockland Vicariate consists of the Upper Peninsula's western counties of Gogebic and Ontonagon.

References

 
Marquette